Traditional Tatar units of measurement were used by Tatars until 1924 but became obsolete when the Soviet Union adopted the metric system.

This list includes their Tatar language names.

Length 

  (дюйм), thumb = 30 mm
  (вершок) = 44.45 mm
  (foot)
 1  = 12  = 304.8 mm
 1  = 4  = 177.8 mm
  (аршин)
 1  = 4  = 16  = 28  = 711.2 mm
 1  = 3  = 7  = 2.133 m
  (верста)
 1  = 500  = 1.0668 km
  or 
 1  = 6-7  = 6.400-7.467 km
  (миля), geographical mile
 1  = 7  = 7.467 km
 , the distance a horse travels without stops
 1  = 15–25 km
 , a day of riding
 1  = 35  = 37.338 km
 , the distance a horse travels in one day, equal to 40–50 km
 , a month of riding, equal to 1120.14 km
 1  = 1050

Area 

 
 1  = 1 2 = 4.552 m2
 
 1  = 3600 2 = 1820.9 m2
  (десятина)
 1  = 2400  = 10,925.4 m2 = 1.09254 ha
 
 1  =   = 5462.7 m2
 
 1  = 1 2 = 1.138 km2

Volume 

  (гарнец) = 3.279 L
  (четверик)
 1  = 8 garnets = 26.238 L
   (четверть)
 1  = 64 garnets = 8 Çirektän sigez = 209.91 L
  (ведро) = 12,299 L
  (пудовка)
 1 , the volume of 16 kg of water
 
 1  = 2  = the volume of 32 kg of water
 
 1  = 4

Mass 

  (допя) = 44.434 mg
  (золотник)
 1  = 96  = 4.265 g
  (лот)
 1  = 3  = 12.797 g
 1  = 32  = 96  = 409.5 g
  (пуд)
 1  = 40  = 16.380 kg
 
 1  =   = 40.951 kg
  (берковец)
 1  = 10  = 163.805 kg

Tatar
History of Tatarstan
Tatar
Tatar units of measurement
Units of measurement by country